Ilijah Paul Gindiri (born July 26, 2002) is an American soccer player who plays for Major League Soccer club Real Salt Lake.

Career

Youth and college 
Paul played soccer for a variety of clubs at youth level, spending time with local sides San Tan Legacy and Arizona Soccer Club, before joining Valparaiso United FC, helping the team to end a fifteen year title drought for Arizona teams at the U.S. Youth Soccer National Championships. In 2018, he left Arizona to join the Real Salt Lake academy in Utah. In for the U16/17 side, Paul made sixteen appearances and led the team with ten goals. 2019 saw Paul join the Phoenix Rising academy, but also sign a USL academy contract that allowed him to retain his college eligibility. In September 2019, he was loaned to Phoenix's USL League One affiliate side FC Tucson, where he made three appearances. In late 2019, Paul joined his final academy side, the Barça Residency Academy, scoring six goals in as many appearances. 

In 2020, Paul committed to playing college soccer at the University of San Francisco. During the 2020-21 season, which was truncated by the COVID-19 pandemic, Paul only made a single appearance for the Dons. In 2021, Paul transferred to the University of Washington, where he went on to score 11 goals and tallying five assists in 39 appearances for the Huskies. In his sophomore season, he was a MAC Hermann Trophy Semifinalist, Pac-12 Offensive Player of the Year, Pac-12 All-Conference First Team, and United Soccer Coaches All-Far West Region First Team.

During the 2022 season, Paul also played with National Premier Soccer League side Crossfire Redmond, scoring three goals in six games.

In December 2022, it was announced that Paul would leave college early and sign a Generation Adidas contract with Major League Soccer, and enter the 2023 MLS SuperDraft.

Senior 
On December 21, 2022, Paul was selected 7th overall in the 2023 MLS SuperDraft by Real Salt Lake.

References

External links 
 Ilijah Paul at University of San Francisco Athletics
 Ilijah Paul at University of Washington Athletics

2002 births
Living people
Association football forwards
National Premier Soccer League players
Phoenix Rising FC players
Real Salt Lake draft picks
Real Salt Lake players
San Francisco Dons men's soccer players
Soccer players from Arizona
FC Tucson players
USL League One players
Washington Huskies men's soccer players